is a district of Nerima, Tokyo, Japan. The administrative place names are Kotakecho 1-chome and Kotakecho 2-chome.

Education

Nerima City Board of Education operates public elementary and junior high schools.

Kotakechō is zoned to Kotakechō Elementary School (小竹小学校), and Asahigaoka Junior High School (練馬区立旭丘中学校).

References

External links

Districts of Nerima